Empresa Argentina de Soluciones Satelitales Sociedad Anónima AR-SAT, usually known simply as ARSAT, is an Argentine government-owned telecommunications company incorporated in 2006 as a Sociedad Anónima through the federal law 26.092. At the time of incorporation, its ownership was shared by the Ministry of Federal Planning, Public Investment and Services (98%) and the Ministry of Economy and Public Finances (2%).

Business lines

Current business products
, ARSAT had four business lines:
 TDA: A country wide digital terrestrial television SATVD-T broadcasting network. The Argentine government ordered a national terrestrial network, where all licensed broadcasting stations can get their programs transmitted through the common system. ARSAT is in charge of developing and installing the initial 90 broadcasting stations.
 Argentine Geostationary Communication Satellite System (SSGAT for ): The Argentine government has decided to fund a national satellite system where all ITU assigned geostationary orbital slots are filled with satellites designed and manufactured locally. It currently includes the ARSAT-1, ARSAT-2 and ARSAT-3.
Conectar Igualdad (Spanish for Connecting Equality): It's the national program for reducing the digital divide. ARSAT is in charge of the satellite segment of the program through the SSGAT.
 TDA: ARSAT is also in charge of the satellite broadcasting segment of the national digital television broadcasting network.
 Federal Fiber Optics Network (RFFO for ): The Argentine government has funded a  fiber optic network to transport Internet, Digital Television, Telephony and private data. ARSAT is in charge of its construction and operation.
 Conectar Igualdad: ARSAT is also in charge of leveraging the RFFO for this digital divide program.
 TDA: ARSAT is also in charge of connecting the TDA terrestrial network through the RFFO.
 Data Center: In its ground station in Benavídez, Tigre Partido, Buenos Aires, ARSAT has built and operates a  TIER III certified data center.
 CEATSA: An environmental testing laboratory. While it is physically connected to INVAP's satellite manufacturing facility, ARSAT holds a majority ownership (80% as of 2015).

Former business products

 Libre.ar (cancelled): In December 2012, gave ARSAT a mandate to set up a cellular network that would be open to small operators. This was possible because the Government had kept a set of frequency bands for a national network operator. The program never materialized and just 18 months later the frequencies were put up for auction.

Satellites

See also

 Nahuelsat S.A.
 CEATSA
 Nahuel 1A
 ARSAT-1
 ARSAT-2
 ARSAT SG-1 (formerly ARSAT-3)

References

External links
 

Communications satellite operators
Direct broadcast satellite services
Space programme of Argentina
Government-owned companies of Argentina